The Songwriters Hall of Fame is an American institution founded in 1969 by songwriter Johnny Mercer and music publishers Abe Olman and Howie Richmond to honor those whose work represents a spectrum of the most beloved songs from the world's popular music songbook. The Hall of Fame only existed as an online virtual collection until 2010, when it was first put on display as a physical gallery inside The Grammy Museum in Los Angeles.

Through 2019, 461 individuals have been inducted.

1970s
Return to top of page

1970
 
 Fred E. Ahlert
 Ernest Ball
 Katharine Lee Bates
 Irving Berlin
 William Billings
 James A. Bland
 James Brockman
 Lew Brown
 Nacio Herb Brown
 Alfred Bryan
 Joe Burke
 Johnny Burke
 Anne Caldwell
 Harry Carroll
 Sidney Clare
 George M. Cohan
 Con Conrad
 Sam Coslow
 Hart Pease Danks
 Reginald De Koven
 Peter De Rose
 Buddy De Sylva
 Mort Dixon
 Walter Donaldson
 Paul Dresser
 Dave Dreyer
 Al Dubin
 Vernon Duke
 Gus Edwards (The Star Maker)
 Raymond B. Egan
 Daniel Decatur Emmett
 Ted Fiorito
 Fred Fisher
 Stephen Foster
 George Gershwin
 L. Wolfe Gilbert
 Patrick Gilmore
 Mack Gordon
 Ferde Grofe
 Woody Guthrie
 Oscar Hammerstein II
 W. C. Handy
 James F. Hanley
 Otto Harbach
 Charles K. Harris
 Lorenz Hart
 Ray Henderson
 Victor Herbert
 Billy Hill
 Joseph E. Howard
 Julia Ward Howe
 Carrie Jacobs-Bond
 Howard Johnson
 James P. Johnson
 James Weldon Johnson
 Arthur Johnston
 Isham Jones
 Scott Joplin
 Irving Kahal
 Gus Kahn
 Bert Kalmar
 Jerome Kern
 Francis Scott Key
 Lead Belly
 Sam M. Lewis
 Frank Loesser
 Ballard MacDonald
 Edward Madden
 Joseph McCarthy
 Jimmy McHugh
 George W. Meyer
 James V. Monaco
 Neil Moret
 Theodore F. Morse
 Lewis F. Muir
 Ethelbert Nevin
 Jack Norworth
 Chauncey Olcott
 John Howard Payne
 James Pierpont
 Lew Pollack
 Cole Porter
 Ralph Rainger
 Harry Revel
 Eben E. Rexford
 Jimmie Rodgers
 Richard Rodgers
 Sigmund Romberg
 George F. Root
 Billy Rose
 Vincent Rose
 Harry Ruby
 Bob Russell
 Jean Schwartz
 Harry B. Smith
 Samuel Francis Smith
 Ted Snyder
 John Philip Sousa
 Andrew B. Sterling
 Harry Tierney
 Charles Tobias
 Roy Turk
 Egbert Van Alstyne
 Albert Von Tilzer
 Harry Von Tilzer
 Fats Waller
 Samuel A. Ward
 Kurt Weill
 Percy Wenrich
 Richard A. Whiting
 Clarence Williams
 Hank Williams
 Spencer Williams
 Septimus Winner (Sep)
 Harry M. Woods
 Henry Clay Work
 Allie Wrubel
 Vincent Youmans

1971
 Harold Arlen
 Hoagy Carmichael
 Duke Ellington
 Dorothy Fields
 Rudolf Friml
 Ira Gershwin
 Alan Jay Lerner
 Johnny Mercer
 Jimmy Van Heusen
 Harry Warren

1972
 Harold Adamson
 Milton Ager
 Burt Bacharach
 Leonard Bernstein
 Jerry Bock
 Irving Caesar
 Sammy Cahn
 J. Fred Coots
 Hal David
 Howard Dietz
 Sammy Fain
 Arthur Freed
 Haven Gillespie
 John Green
 Yip Harburg
 Sheldon Harnick
 Ted Koehler
 Burton Lane
 Edgar Leslie
 Frederick Loewe
 Joseph Meyer
 Mitchell Parish
 Andy Razaf
 Leo Robin
 Arthur Schwartz
 Pete Seeger
 Carl Sigman
 Jule Styne
 Ned Washington
 Mabel Wayne
 Paul Francis Webster
 Jack Yellen

1975
 Louis Alter
 Mack David
 Benny Davis
 Edward Eliscu
 Bud Green
 Lou Handman
 Edward Heyman
 Jack Lawrence
 Stephen Sondheim

1977
 Ray Evans
 Jay Livingston

1980s
Return to top of page

1980
 Alan Bergman
 Marilyn Bergman
 Betty Comden
 Adolph Green
 Herb Magidson

1981
 Cy Coleman
 Jerry Livingston
 Johnny Marks

1982
 Rube Bloom
 Bob Dylan
 Jerry Herman
 Gordon Jenkins
 Harold Rome
 Jerry Ross
 Paul Simon
 Al Stillman
 Meredith Willson

1983
 Harry Akst
 Ralph Blane
 Ervin Drake
 Fred Ebb
 Bob Hilliard
 John Kander
 Hugh Martin
 Neil Sedaka
 Harry Tobias
 Alec Wilder
 Stevie Wonder

1984
 Richard Adler
 Bennie Benjamin
 Neil Diamond
 Norman Gimbel
 Al Hoffman
 Henry Mancini
 Maceo Pinkard
 Billy Strayhorn
 George David Weiss

1985
 Saul Chaplin
 Gene De Paul
 Kris Kristofferson
 Jerry Leiber
 Carolyn Leigh
 Don Raye
 Fred Rose
 Mike Stoller
 Charles Strouse

1986
 Chuck Berry
 Boudleaux Bryant
 Felice Bryant
 Marvin Hamlisch
 Buddy Holly
 Jimmy Webb

1987
 Sam Cooke
 Gerry Goffin
 Carole King
 John Lennon
 Barry Mann
 Paul McCartney
 Bob Merrill
 Carole Bayer Sager
 Cynthia Weil

1988
 Leroy Anderson
 Noël Coward
 Lamont Dozier
 Brian Holland
 Eddie Holland

1989
 Lee Adams
 Leslie Bricusse
 Eddie DeLange
 Anthony Newley
 Roy Orbison

1990s
Return to top of page

1990
 Jim Croce
 Michel Legrand
 Smokey Robinson

1991
 Jeff Barry
 Otis Blackwell
 Howard Greenfield
 Ellie Greenwich
 Antônio Carlos Jobim

1992
 Linda Creed
 Billy Joel
 Elton John
 Mort "Doc" Pomus
 Mort Shuman
 Bernie Taupin

1993
 Paul Anka
 Mick Jagger (The Rolling Stones)
 Bert Kaempfert
 Herb Rehbein
 Keith Richards (The Rolling Stones)

1994
 Barry Gibb (Bee Gees)
 Maurice Gibb (Bee Gees)
 Robin Gibb (Bee Gees)
 Otis Redding
 Lionel Richie
 Carly Simon

1995
 Bob Crewe
 Kenneth Gamble
 Bob Gaudio
 Leon Huff
 Andrew Lloyd Webber
 Max Steiner

1996
 Charles Aznavour
 John Denver
 Ray Noble

1997
 Harlan Howard
 Jimmy Kennedy
 Ernesto Lecuona
 Joni Mitchell
 Phil Spector

1998
 John Barry
 Dave Bartholomew
 Fats Domino
 Larry Stock
 John Williams

1999
 Bobby Darin
 Peggy Lee
 Tim Rice
 Bruce Springsteen

2000s
Return to top of page

2000
 James Brown
 Glenn Frey (Eagles)
 Don Henley (Eagles)
 Curtis Mayfield
 James Taylor
 Brian Wilson

2001
 Eric Clapton
 Willie Nelson
 Dolly Parton
 Diane Warren
 Paul Williams

2002
 Nickolas Ashford
 Michael Jackson
 Barry Manilow
 Randy Newman
 Valerie Simpson
 Sting

2003
 Phil Collins
 John Deacon (Queen)
 Little Richard
 Brian May (Queen)
 Freddie Mercury (Queen)
 Van Morrison
 Roger Taylor (Queen)

2004
 Charles Fox
 Al Green
 Daryl Hall 
 Don McLean
 John Oates 
 Barrett Strong
 Norman Whitfield

2005
 David Bowie
 Steve Cropper
 John Fogerty
 Isaac Hayes
 David Porter
 Richard M. Sherman
 Robert B. Sherman
 Bill Withers

2006
 Thom Bell
 Henry Cosby
 Mac Davis
 Will Jennings
 Sylvia Moy

2007
 Don Black
 Irving Burgie
 Jackson Browne
 Merle Haggard
 Michael Masser
 Teddy Randazzo
 Bobby Weinstein

2008
 Desmond Child
 Albert Hammond
 Loretta Lynn
 Alan Menken
 John Sebastian

2009
 Jon Bon Jovi (Bon Jovi)
 Eddie Brigati
 Felix Cavaliere
 Roger Cook 
 David Crosby 
 Roger Greenaway
 Galt MacDermot
 Graham Nash 
 James Rado
 Gerome Ragni
 Richie Sambora (Bon Jovi)
 Stephen Schwartz
 Stephen Stills

2010s
Return to top of page

2010
 Tom Adair
 Philip Bailey (Earth, Wind & Fire)
 Leonard Cohen
 Matt Dennis
 Jackie DeShannon
 Larry Dunn (Earth, Wind & Fire)
 David Foster
 Johnny Mandel
 Bob Marley
 Al McKay (Earth, Wind & Fire)
 Laura Nyro
 Sunny Skylar
 Jesse Stone
 Maurice White (Earth, Wind & Fire)
 Verdine White (Earth, Wind & Fire)

2011
 John Bettis
 Garth Brooks
 Tom Kelly
 Leon Russell
 Billy Steinberg
 Allen Toussaint

2012
 Tom Jones
 Don Schlitz
 Bob Seger
 Gordon Lightfoot
 Harvey Schmidt
 Jim Steinman

2013
 Lou Gramm (Foreigner (band))
 Tony Hatch
 Mick Jones (Foreigner (band))
 Holly Knight
 Joe Perry (Aerosmith)
 J. D. Souther
 Steven Tyler (Aerosmith)

2014
 Ray Davies (The Kinks)
 Donovan
 Graham Gouldman
 Mark James
 Jim Weatherly

2015
 Bobby Braddock
 Willie Dixon
 Jerry Garcia
 Robert Hunter
 Toby Keith
 Cyndi Lauper
 Linda Perry

2016
 Elvis Costello
 Bernard Edwards 
 Marvin Gaye
 Tom Petty
 Nile Rodgers 
 Chip Taylor

2017
 Babyface
 Peter Cetera (Chicago)
 Berry Gordy
 Jimmy Jam and Terry Lewis
 Jay Z
 Robert Lamm (Chicago)
 Max Martin
 James Pankow (Chicago)

2018
 Bill Anderson
 Robert "Kool" Bell (Kool & the Gang)
 Ronald Bell (Kool & the Gang)
 George Brown (Kool & the Gang)
 Steve Dorff
 Jermaine Dupri
 Alan Jackson
 John Mellencamp
 James "J.T." Taylor (Kool & the Gang)
 Allee Willis

2019
 Dallas Austin
 Missy Elliott
 Tom T. Hall
 John Prine
 Cat Stevens
 Jack Tempchin

2020s
Return to top of page

2022

 Mariah Carey
 Chad Hugo (The Neptunes)
 The Isley Brothers
 Annie Lennox (Eurythmics)
 Steve Miller
 Rick Nowels
 William "Mickey" Stevenson
 David A. Stewart (Eurythmics)
 Pharrell Williams (The Neptunes)

2023

Glen Ballard
Snoop Dogg
Gloria Estefan
Jeff Lynne (Electric Light Orchestra)
Teddy Riley
Liz Rose
Sade

References

External links
 Songwriters Hall of Fame

Music-related lists
Lists of musicians
Lists of composers
Songwriters
Writers halls of fame